Taylor Tran (born September 15, 1992 in Loma Linda, California) is an American-born former competitive ice dancer who competed for Lithuania with partner Saulius Ambrulevičius. Together, they are the 2015 Pavel Roman Memorial silver medalists and 2015 Lithuanian national champions. They qualified to the free dance at the 2017 European Championships.

Career 
Tran began learning to skate in 1998. She began a partnership with Samuel Kaplun in July 2012. The two finished 13th in senior ice dancing at the 2013 U.S. Championships.

Partnership with Ambrulevičius 
Around July 2014, Tran teamed up with Lithuania's Saulius Ambrulevičius, who had decided to switch from single skating. They elected to represent Lithuania and made their international debut at the Tallinn Trophy in December 2014. At the Estonian event, they finished 5th and earned the minimum scores to appear at the 2015 European Championships in Stockholm. They missed the cut for the free dance in Sweden and at the 2016 European Championships in Bratislava, Slovakia.

Tran/Ambrulevičius qualified to the final segment at the 2017 European Championships in Ostrava, Czech Republic; they ranked 20th in the short dance, 17th in the free, and 18th overall. After the 2017 World Championships Ambrulevičius and T. Tran announced that they were separating and would not compete together any more.

Programs

With Ambrulevičius

With Kaplun

Competitive highlights 
CS: Challenger Series

With Ambrulevičius for Lithuania

With Kaplun

References

External links 
 

1992 births
American female ice dancers
Living people
People from Loma Linda, California
Lithuanian female ice dancers
21st-century American women